Harrisomyia is a genus of crane fly in the family Limoniidae.

Distribution
New Zealand.

Species
H. bicuspidata Alexander, 1923
H. terebrella Alexander, 1932

References

Limoniidae
Nematocera genera
Diptera of Australasia